The 2016 1. deild karla (English: Men's First Division) was the 62nd season of second-tier Icelandic football. The league began on 6 May and concluded on 24 September.

Teams
The league will be contested by twelve clubs. Eight remained in the division from the 2015 season, while four new clubs joined the 1. deild karla:
 Keflavík and Leiknir R. were relegated from the 2015 Úrvalsdeild, replacing Víkingur Ólafsvík and Þróttur Reykjavík who were promoted to the 2016 Úrvalsdeild
 Huginn and Leiknir F. were promoted from the 2015 2. deild karla, in place of BÍ/Bolungarvík and Grótta who were relegated to the 2016 2. deild karla

Club information

League table

Results grid
Each team plays every opponent once home and away for a total of 22 matches per club, and 132 matches altogether.

Top goalscorers

References

External links
 IcelandFootball.net - Championship 2016 

1. deild karla (football) seasons
Iceland
Iceland
2